Gernika Kirol Elkartea Saski Baloia, also known as Lointek Gernika Bizkaia for sponsorship reasons, is a women's basketball team based in Gernika, Basque Country, Spain. The team currently plays in Liga Femenina.

History
Founded in 1996, Gernika KESB promoted for the first time to Femenina on 27 April 2014, by beating Fundal Alcobendas by 57–48 in the final game of the promotion playoffs.

Season by season

References

External links
 Profile at Federación Española de Baloncesto

Women's basketball teams in Spain
Basque basketball teams
Liga Femenina de Baloncesto teams
Basketball teams established in 1996
Guernica